"Never Gonna Leave Your Side" is the fifth single released from New Zealand-British singer Daniel Bedingfield's first album, Gotta Get thru This (2002). Issued in Australia on 30 June 2003 and in the United Kingdom on 21 July 2003, the song became Bedingfield's third number-one song on the UK Singles Chart, topping the chart on the week of 27 July 2003. The song also peaked at  11 in Ireland and No. 13 in New Zealand.

Music video
The music video for "Never Gonna Leave Your Side" was filmed in Ronda, Spain, known as the "Dreaming City". By coincidence, Ronda, Spain is located on the antipode of Auckland, New Zealand, where Bedingfield was born.

Track listings
 UK CD single
 "Never Gonna Leave Your Side"
 "Never Gonna Leave Your Side" (Metro Mix radio edit)
 "Right Girl" (live)
 "Never Gonna Leave Your Side" (video)

 UK cassette single
 "Never Gonna Leave Your Side" (album version)
 "If You're Not The One" (The Passengerz Girlfriend Club Mix)

 UK DVD single
 "Never Gonna Leave Your Side"
 "If You're Not the One" (live video from the Shepherd's Bush Empire)
 "Never Gonna Leave Your Side" (Metro Mix)
 "If You're Not the One" (American video)

 Australian CD single
 "Never Gonna Leave Your Side" (album version) – 3:53
 "Never Gonna Leave Your Side" (Metro Mix) – 4:47
 "If You're Not the One" (The Passengerz Girlfriend Club Mix) – 7:09
 "Never Gonna Leave Your Side" (enhanced video) – 3:53
 "If You're Not the One" (enhanced US version) – 4:02

Charts

Weekly charts

Year-end charts

Release history

References

2003 singles
2003 songs
Daniel Bedingfield songs
Polydor Records singles
Song recordings produced by Mark Taylor (record producer)
Songs written by Daniel Bedingfield
UK Singles Chart number-one singles